Tylden is a village in Chris Hani District Municipality in the Eastern Cape province of South Africa.

Village 37 km south-east of Queenstown and 20 km north of Cathcart. Administered by a village management board. It was named after Captain Tylden of the Royal Engineers, officer in charge of a campaign against the Tambookies (Tembus) in 1851.

References

Populated places in the Enoch Mgijima Local Municipality